Eznabad (also Romanized as Eznābād; also known as ‘Azīnābād and Ez̄navā) is a village in Bahnemir Rural District, Bahnemir District, Babolsar County, Mazandaran Province, Iran. At the 2006 census, its population was 745, in 189 families.

References 

Populated places in Babolsar County